Bankhaus Adolph Meyer was a private bank, and the oldest in Hanover, Germany. It played a prominent role in the industrialization of Lower Saxony, particularly in the cotton and coal and steel industries, especially since the time of the Kingdom of Hanover. During the Nazi era, it was "Aryanized". It is now located on Schillerstraße at the corner of Rosenstraße in Hannover's Mitte district.

History

Since the Middle Ages 

The origins of the bank date back to the Middle Ages and passed into the hands of the David family in the 17th century. In 1792, Simon Meyer, at that time authorized signatory of the then Bankhaus Meyer Michael David, took over the company, eventually leaving it to his son Adolph Meyer. The bank, then located in an old patrician house in Langestraße (Calenberger Neustadt), was soon renamed Bankhaus Adolph Meyer by Adolph Meyer with his own name.

As the business grew, Adolph Meyer had a new bank building constructed according to his own architectural plans from 1845 to 1850 outside Hanover's former city fortifications on an open field in Ernst-August-Stad.

In the 1850s and 1960s, the bank played a significant role in the founding of numerous companies under Adolph Meyer, especially after the Kingdom of Hanover joined the German Customs Union.

After Meyer's death, the bank was directed by his sons Emil Meyer and in particular by the Prussian Kommerzienrat Sigmund Meyer, one of the first promoters of the potash salt industry in the province of Hanover. During his lifetime, his son Heinrich Meyer joined the company as co-owner, as did the authorized signatory Ludwig Silberberg.

Bank "Aryanizations" in Hanover 
After Nazis came to power in Germany in 1933, Jewish-owned banks were "Aryanized", that is, transferred to non-Jewish owners. Hannover's oldest private bank suffered a similar fate to the three other Jewish-owned private banks:

 in November 1936, the Gau economic advisor Julius Albert Maier took over "the customer base and the "non-Jewish" employees of Bankhaus A. Spiegelberg, which had opened in 1854" - and moved the business premises of his Maier banking firm to Spiegelberg's more prestigious premises in the city center;
 seizure of the Bankhaus Hallbaum & Co. in May 1937 "sämtliche Geschäftsverbindungen und Immobilien von Wilhelm Lilienfeld & Co";
 wickelte die Lister Bank Lücke & Co. KG two months later the Bankhaus D. Peretz ab – "und verlegte ihren Firmensitz in dessen ehemalige Geschäftsräume";
 In 1938, Gauwirtschaftsberater Julius Maier took over the business of Bankhaus Adolph Meyer

See also 

 Aryanization
 The Holocaust
 Anti-Jewish legislation in pre-war Nazi Germany

Literature 

 Paul Siedentopf: Bankhaus Adolph Meyer. In: Das Buch der alten Firmen der Stadt Hannover im Jahr 1927, Leipzig: Jubiläums-Verlag Walter Gerlach, 1927, S. 152
 Zeitschrift des Gewerbevereins für das Königreich Hannover, Neujahrsnummer 1862
 Albert Lefèvre: Der Beitrag der hannoverschen Industrie zum technischen Fortschritt. In: Hannoversche Geschichtsblätter, Neue Folge 24 (1970), S. 269f.
 Rainer Slotta: Technische Denkmäler in der Bundesrepublik Deutschland, Teil 3 (fälschlicherweise als Nr. 17 bezeichnet): Die Kali- und Steinsalzindustrie, in der Reihe Veröffentlichungen aus dem Deutschen Bergbau-Museum Bochum, hrsg. vom Deutschen Bergbau-Museum, Bochum, Bochum: Deutsches Bergbau-Museum, 1980, ISBN 3-921533-16-3, S. 276
 Walter Buschmann: Linden. Geschichte einer Industriestadt im 19. Jahrhundert, zugleich Dissertation 1979 an der Universität Hannover, in der Reihe Quellen und Darstellungen zur Geschichte Niedersachsens, Bd. 92, Hildesheim: Lax, 1981, ISBN 3-7848-3492-2, S. 80–83 u.ö.
 Peter Schulze: Bankhaus Adolph Meyer. In: Klaus Mlynek, Waldemar R. Röhrbein (Hrsg.) u. a.: Stadtlexikon Hannover. Von den Anfängen bis in die Gegenwart. Schlütersche, Hannover 2009, ISBN 978-3-89993-662-9, S. 47.

References and notes 

Province of Hanover
Kingdom of Hanover
Electorate of Hanover
Companies acquired from Jews under Nazi rule